Silver Lake Historic District is a national historic district located at Silver Lake, Kosciusko County, Indiana. The district encompasses 19 contributing buildings in the central business district and surrounding residential section of Silver Lake. It developed between about 1865 and 1920, and includes notable examples of Italianate, Romanesque Revival, Classical Revival, and Early Commercial style architecture. Notable buildings include the former Enos Hotel (c. 1915), Municipal Building (c. 1910), and buildings on North Jefferson and East Main streets.

It was listed on the National Register of Historic Places in 1992.

References

Historic districts on the National Register of Historic Places in Indiana
Italianate architecture in Indiana
Romanesque Revival architecture in Indiana
Neoclassical architecture in Indiana
Historic districts in Kosciusko County, Indiana
National Register of Historic Places in Kosciusko County, Indiana
Chicago school architecture in Indiana